Kamina Johnson Smith is a Jamaican attorney and politician. A member of the Jamaica Labour Party, Johnson Smith is currently the Minister of Foreign Affairs and Foreign Trade in the second Holness cabinet. Since 2009 Johnson Smith has been a member of the Senate and since 2016 has been the Leader of Government Business in the Senate.

Life
Born in St. Andrew, Jamaica, Johnson Smith is one of four children of former diplomat Anthony Johnson, and is married to Jason Smith. She received a Master of Laws in Commercial Law from the London School of Economics, a Bachelor of Laws from the University of the West Indies, Cave Hill and a Bachelor of Arts in French and International Relations from the University of the West Indies, Mona campus. She served on the Corporate Governance Committee of the Private Sector Organization of Jamaica (PSOJ) for several years, and was a Director of the Factories Corporation of Jamaica and the Early Childhood Commission.

Political career 
Johnson Smith is Jamaica’s first female Minister of Foreign Affairs and Foreign Trade and was re-appointed for a second term in September 2020, following re-election of her party to office. She was concurrently re-appointed Leader of Government Business in the Senate and Chair of several Senate Committees.  Within the cabinet, Johnson Smith chairs the International Relations Sub-Committee, is a member of the Economic Growth and Job Creation Sub-Committee, and is a member of Jamaica’s National Security Council.

Ministerial role 

Johnson Smith's roles have included chairmanship of the CARIFORUM group, in which capacity she led the opening of discussions with the UK on post-Brexit trade arrangements.  She served as President of the ACP Council of Ministers in 2018,  presiding over the process which secured the negotiating mandate of the ACP for a post-Cotonou Agreement with the EU.  In the same year, she also chaired the CARICOM Council of Foreign Ministers  and attended G20 and G7 meetings, the latter being the first for a Jamaican Foreign Minister. In 2021 Johnson Smith chaired the CARICOM Council on Trade and Economic Development, and since March 2019 Jamaica has been the ACP Coordinator within the WTO, a role headed by Johnson Smith. She is a member of the recently launched EU-LAC Foundation Women’s Network.  
Johnson Smith oversaw the development of a National Foreign Trade Policy and Action Plan; the creation of an Economic Diplomacy Programme in conjunction with Jamaica’s Trade and Investment Promotion Agency (JAMPRO); promulgated a Consular Manual to improve service delivery to citizens overseas; expanded the number of countries with which Jamaica has established diplomatic relations. She presided over two biennial diaspora conferences, diaspora consultations and engagements in 14 countries; tabled a National Diaspora Policy as a Green Paper and established the Global Jamaica Diaspora Council and the Global Jamaica Diaspora Youth Council.  
During the first year of the COVID-19 pandemic, she established and chaired the National External Support Coordination Committee to ensure effective coordination, alignment, oversight and accountability for bilateral and international donations in support of the Government’s response to the pandemic. As Leader of Government Business in the Senate, in her first term of office, she led over 110 debates including the passage of 69 statutes and 48 resolutions across government portfolios - ranging from the establishment of states of public emergency to curb the country’s inordinately high crime rate; reforms to the justice system and the fight against human trafficking; the strengthening of laws addressing AML/CFT frameworks; the modernization of corporate, partnership and trust laws, as well as intellectual property frameworks; data protection; public procurement; road safety; building and land titling. She has served on Joint Select Committees reviewing laws related to violence against women and children, reform of the anti-corruption institutional framework in Jamaica, reform of Jamaica’s customs law and the law to establish the independence of the Central Bank.  With the Ministry of Foreign Affairs and Foreign Trade she began a strategic review of the Foreign Ministry and the establishment of a Foreign Service Institute.

Commonwealth Secretary-General candidacy
Johnson Smith, as Minister of Foreign Affairs and Foreign Trade, launched Jamaica’s candidature for Secretary-General of the Commonwealth in London, United Kingdom in April 2022, in an attempt backed by the United Kingdom to unseat incumbent Secretary-General Patricia Scotland. 

At the 2022 Commonwealth Heads of Government Meeting held in Kigali, Rwanda, Lady Scotland was re-elected to a second term, reportedly defeating Johnson Smith by 27 votes to 24. Since then, there has been repeated calls by the Jamaican opposition party for an investigation in the use of Jamaican government resource to fund her failed campaign.

See also
List of current foreign ministers
Women in the House of Representatives of Jamaica

References

Living people
Alumni of the London School of Economics
University of the West Indies alumni
Members of the Senate of Jamaica
Female foreign ministers
People from Saint Andrew Parish, Jamaica
Foreign ministers of Jamaica
Women government ministers of Jamaica
Jamaican women diplomats
Year of birth missing (living people)
21st-century Jamaican women politicians
21st-century Jamaican politicians
Jamaican people of European descent